The Bee Gees are also known to have performed and/or recorded a number of songs and other instrumentals which have never been officially released on a single or album. The group's unreleased works were later recorded by well-known artists such as P.P. Arnold, Leo Sayer, Percy Sledge and others.

Sessions

Spicks And Specks

Bee Gees' 1st

Horizontal

Idea

"Tomorrow Tomorrow"

Cucumber Castle

2 Years On

Trafalgar

To Whom It May Concern

A Kick in the Head Is Worth Eight in the Pants

All of the songs on what would be the Bee Gees' 12th studio album, A Kick in the Head Is Worth Eight in the Pants are unreleased, except "Wouldn't I Be Someone", "Elisa", "It Doesn't Matter Much to Me" and "King and Country".

Main Course

Children of the World

Spirits Having Flown

Living Eyes

Staying Alive soundtrack

E.S.P.

References

Bee Gees